Consort Gang may refer to:

Consort Gang (Gung Ye's wife) ( 10th century), wife of Gung Ye, ruler of Taebong
Lady Sinjuwon ( 10th century), consort of Taejo of Goryeo
Queen Sindeok (1356–1396), wife of Taejo of Joseon
Crown Princess Minhoe (1611-1646), wife of Crown Prince Sohyeon

See also
Gang Jin-ui, posthumous queen of Goryeo